Post-romanticism or Postromanticism refers to a range of cultural endeavors and attitudes emerging in the late nineteenth and early twentieth centuries, after the period of Romanticism.

In literature 
The period of post-romanticism in poetry is defined as the mid-to-late nineteenth century, but includes the much earlier poetry of Letitia Elizabeth Landon and Tennyson.

Notable post-romantic writers 
Herman Melville
Thomas Carlyle
Gustave Flaubert

In music 
Post-romanticism in music refers to composers who wrote classical symphonies, operas, and songs in transitional style that constituted a blend of late romantic and early modernist musical languages.
Arthur Berger described the mysticism of La Jeune France as post-Romanticism rather than neo-Romanticism. 

Post-romantic composers created music that used traditional forms combined with advanced harmony. Béla Bartók, for example, "in such Strauss-influenced works as Duke Bluebeard's Castle", may be described as having still used "dissonance ['such intervals as fourths and sevenths'] in traditional forms of music for purposes of post-romantic expression, not simply always as an appeal to the primal art of sound".

Other notable post-romantic composers 

Richard Wagner
Pyotr Ilyich Tchaikovsky
Anton Bruckner
Giacomo Puccini
Richard Strauss
Gustav Mahler
Jean Sibelius
Alexander Scriabin
Sergei Rachmaninoff
Modest Mussorgsky

References

Further reading
 Burkholder, J. Peter, Donald Jay Grout, and Claude V. Palisca. A History of Western Music, 7th ed., New York: W. W. Norton, 2006.
 
 Tilby, Michael. Review of Claudia Moscovici, Romanticism and Postromanticism. French Studies: A Quarterly Review, vol. 62, no. 4, October 2008, pp. 486–487.

See also
Modernism
Musical nationalism
Neoclassicism

Art movements
Romanticism
19th-century classical music
20th-century classical music
19th-century literature